Andrea Rossi is a Development Economist working on human rights. He was the Director of the Measurement and Human Rights Program at the Carr Centre for Human Rights Policy at Harvard Kennedy School, where he was a policy Fellow. He is currently working for the United Nations as an economic and social policy advisor.

He has been a United Nations Officer working as advisor on child protection and migration for the United Nations Children's Fund (UNICEF)  headquarters in New York City. He has been a research coordinator at the UNICEF Innocenti Research Centre, Florence working specifically on child trafficking. Mr. Rossi is an economist with a particular focus on development and applied research. He previously worked for the International Labour Organization ILO in the East Africa Area Office, in Tanzania in charge of research and statistics on  child labour.

External links
 Carr Center for Human Rights Policy 
 ILO International Labour Organization

Living people
United Nations experts
Harvard Kennedy School people
Year of birth missing (living people)
UNICEF people
International Labour Organization people
Italian officials of the United Nations